Platycarpheae is a tribe of the Asteraceae that is native to Namibia and South Africa. The tribe contains two genera and a total of three species.

References

Vernonioideae
Asteraceae tribes